How to Use Sexy is the fourth studio album by Japanese pop singer Maki Goto. The album was released on September 19, 2007 via Piccolo Town in two editions: a regular edition with catalog number PKCP-5096 and a limited edition with catalog number PKCP-5094~5 which came with a DVD.

Track listing

CD 
 "How to Use Loneliness"
 "Give Me Love"
 "Some Boys! Touch"
 "City Wind"
 
 "Glass no Pumps"
 "Day Break"
 
 "Secret"
 "Life"

DVD 
 "Glass no Pumps (Mirror Ver.)"
 "Some Boys! Touch (Sexy Ver.)"
 "Secret (Bathroom Ver.)"
 "Making Of"

Oricon ranks and sales 

Total sales: 14,996

External links 
 How to Use Sexy entry on the Up-Front Works official website
 Tsunku's comments

2007 albums
Maki Goto albums